SeaMicro, Inc. was a subsidiary of AMD that specialized in the ultra-dense computer server industry. It ceased operations on 16 April 2015.

History
In July 2007, Andrew Feldman, Gary Lauterbach, and Anil Rao founded SeaMicro. Series A investments from Crosslink Capital and Draper Fisher Jurvetson closed in December 2007. Khosla Ventures led the series B investment round in 2009. In 2012, SeaMicro was acquired by AMD for $334 million. The application of MicroSea servers were most prominent in data centers, such as the Gene Center at the Ludwig Maximilian University of Munich for scientific research. In 2013, SeaMicro AMD collaborated with Verizon Communications to power their new cloud services. It has empowered Verizon to introduce fine-grained server configuration options that allow for more flexibility in instance-sizing by allowing administrators to select a processor speed between 500 MHz and 2 GHz and to scale DRAM up and down in 512 MB increments.

Products
The first product from SeaMicro was the SM10000, along with the SM10000-XE, which achieved Red Hat Certification in 2011 when operating on Red Hat Enterprise Linux. A more recent model, The SeaMicro SM15000 was also designed to support Citrix Xen Servers, VMware ESXi software, and both Linux and Microsoft Windows Operating systems. Specifications of newer versions have reached computing benchmarks of 5 petabytes of storage, 64 CPUs, a 1,000 Virtual machine capacity, and 1.28 Tb/s of bandwidth.> Another product of interest is the 10U Rack Unit, which can provide a total of 2,048 CPU cores, and 16 TBs of RAM and data is transferred through a custom "Freedom Fabric" for supercomputers unique to SeaMicro microservers.

Awards
 GigaOM: GreenNet 2011: 10 Big Ideas Winners
 Silicon Valley/ San Jose Journal: Best Emerging Cleantech Company 2011
 2011 Best Electronic Design Winners: Computer Category
 Platts: 2011 Rising Star award

References

External links
 
 Architectural tradeoffs in the Sea Micro SM 10000 Server - Talk given at Stanford University by SeaMicro founder & CTO, Gary Lauterbach. (video archive)

2007 establishments in California
2012 mergers and acquisitions
2015 disestablishments in California
AMD
Computer storage devices
Supercomputers
Servers (computing)
Ultra-dense servers
American companies established in 2007
American companies disestablished in 2015
Computer companies established in 2007
Computer companies disestablished in 2015
Defunct computer companies of the United States